El Camino Real (The Royal Road), sometimes translated in English as The King's Highway. It was a single highway which connected Mexico City, and Santa Fe New Mexico, to parts of Florida, and California; which is reflected today in Spanish names of American cities.

Roads
 El Camino Real (California), an commemorative route in California from San Diego to Sonoma
 El Camino Real (Florida), an historic trail from St. Augustine westward to the Spanish missions in north Florida
 El Camino Real (Missouri), a historic trail connecting Spanish settlements in cities like New Madrid and Ste. Genevieve
 El Camino Real (Mexico), a road through Yucatán and Campeche; see 
 El Camino Real (Panama), connecting Panama City and Portobelo; see History of Panama (to 1821)
 El Camino Real (Sinaloa and Sonora), an historical road that connected Spanish and later Mexican settlements in Sinaloa and Sonora; see Casanate, Álamos Municipality, Sonora 
 El Camino Real de Chiapas, connecting the colonial cities of Chiapa de Corzo, México with Antigua Guatemala; see San Andrés Sajcabajá
 El Camino Real de los Tejas, a Spanish mission trail running through Texas and into Louisiana
 El Camino Real de Tierra Adentro, an historical road that went from Mexico City to Santa Fe, New Mexico

Music
 El Camino Real (Reed), a 1985 composition for concert band by Alfred Reed
 El Camino Real (album), by Todos Tus Muertos, 1998
 El Camino Real, a 2007 album by William Basinski
 El Camino Real, a 1997 album by Carmaig de Forest
 El Camino Real, a 2014 album by Camper Van Beethoven
 El Camino Real, a 2020 EP by Jonathan Wilson

Other uses
 Camino Real, a 1953 play by Tennessee Williams
 Camino Real Hotels, a hotel chain in Mexico
 El Camino Real Charter High School, Los Angeles, California, United States
 Episcopal Diocese of El Camino Real, encompassing northern and central California

See also
 El Camino (disambiguation)
 
 King's Highway (disambiguation)
 Royal Road, Persia
 Via Regia, historical road